The Lightner double is a conventional double in bridge, used to direct the opening lead against slam contracts. It was devised by Theodore Lightner. 

The Lightner double is a call made by the partner of the player who will make the opening lead. It asks for an "unusual" opening lead. The opening lead is often crucial to the play of the hand, and the right opening lead is often the only chance for the defenders to defeat the contract. The doubler will most often have a void in a side suit, or sometimes AQ or KQ in the suit bid by the dummy. The partner is expected to find the correct lead, which might be unusual from his viewpoint; in any case, he should not lead a trump. The most common interpretation is to lead the first suit (other than trumps) bid by the opponents.

In his 1945 book Why You Lose at Bridge, S. J. "Skid" Simon called it "one of the most brilliant contributions to Contract Bridge yet made".

References

External links
 Bridge Guys website.

Bridge conventions